Wolfgang Kneib (born 20 November 1952 in Zornheim) is a retired German football player. He spent eight seasons in the Bundesliga with Borussia Mönchengladbach and Arminia Bielefeld. He scored two goals for Arminia from penalty kicks.

Honours
 European Cup finalist: 1976–77
 UEFA Cup winner: 1978–79
 UEFA Cup finalist: 1979–80
 Bundesliga champion: 1976–77
 Bundesliga runner-up: 1977–78

References

External links
 

1952 births
Living people
German footballers
1. FSV Mainz 05 players
Borussia Mönchengladbach players
Arminia Bielefeld players
Bundesliga players
2. Bundesliga players
UEFA Cup winning players

Association football goalkeepers
West German footballers
People from Mainz-Bingen
Footballers from Rhineland-Palatinate